The 2017 Vale of Glamorgan Council election took place on Thursday 4 May 2017 to elect members of Vale of Glamorgan Council in Wales. There were 47 council seats available, across 23 wards. This was the same day as other United Kingdom local elections.

The previous full council election took place on 3 May 2012, with the next full council election taking place on 5 May 2022.

Election result
In winning 23 seats the Conservatives had a surprising resurgence, taking back the council from the previous coalition of Labour councillors and Llantwit First Independents. The Conservatives were one seat short of an overall majority. Labour-held wards such as Barry's Dyfan and Illtyd were taken by the Tories, as was the previous Plaid Cymru stronghold of Dinas Powys.

|}

Ward overview

[a] Plaid Cymru had won a seat from Labour at a by-election on 2 August 2012
[b] The Conservatives had won a seat from the Llantwit First Independents at a by-election on 26 March 2015
[c] Cllr Mahoney was elected in 2012 for UKIP but re-designated himself as Independent in February 2016

Ward results
These are the full results.

Baruc (two seats)

Buttrills (two seats)

Cadoc (two seats)

Castleland (two seats)

Cornerswell (two seats)

Court (two seats)

Cowbridge (three seats)

Dinas Powys (four seats)

Dyfan (two seats)

Gibbonsdown (two seats)

Illtyd (three seats)

Llandough (one seat)

Llandow/Ewenny (one seat)

Llantwit Major (four seats)

Peterston-super-Ely (one seat)

Plymouth (two seats)

Rhoose (two seats)

St Athan (one seat)

St Augustine's (two seats)

St Brides Major (one seat)

Stanwell (two seats)

Sully (two seats)

Wenvoe (one seat)

References

2017 Welsh local elections
2017